John Roberts (1577 – 10 December 1610) was a Welsh Benedictine monk and priest, and was the first Prior of St. Gregory's, Douai, France (now Downside Abbey). Returning to England as a missionary priest during the period of recusancy, he was martyred at Tyburn. He is venerated as a saint by the Roman Catholic church.

Early life and conversion to Catholicism

Roberts was born in 1577 in Trawsfynydd, a small village in Snowdonia, north Wales, the son of John and Anna Roberts of Rhiw Goch Farm. His father was a member of the Welsh nobility and was descended from the Welsh Princes, was a farmer. Roberts was baptised into the Anglican faith inside the local parish church of St Madryn but is said to have received his early education from an elderly man who had been a Cistercian monk at Cymer Abbey just outside Dolgellau until its dissolution by Henry VIII in 1537. He attended St. John's College, Oxford in February, 1595 before leaving after two years to study law at Furnival's Inn, London.

During his travels in Europe, he left behind both the law and his former faith as he converted to Catholicism on a visit to Notre Dame Cathedral in Paris. He moved on to Spain and joined St Benedict's Monastery, Valladolid, and became a member of this community in 1598, where he was known as Brother John of Merioneth in reference to his birthplace.

Benedictine missionary
From Valladolid he was sent to make his novitiate at San Martín Pinario, Santiago de Compostela, where he made his profession towards the end of 1600. Having completed his studies he was ordained, and set out for England on 26 December 1602. Although observed by a Government spy, Roberts and his companions succeeded in entering the country in April 1603, where he was appointed vicar of the English monks of the Spanish Congregation on the Mission. He was arrested and banished on 13 May.

He reached Douai, in northern France, on 24 May. Soon he managed to return to England; he worked among the plague victims in London. In 1604, while embarking for Spain with four postulants, including William Scott (later known as Maurus Scott) he was again arrested. Not recognized as a priest, he was released and again banished, but he returned to England at once.

On 5 November 1605, while Justice Grange was searching the house of Mrs. Percy, first wife of Thomas Percy, who was involved in the Gunpowder Plot, he found Roberts there and arrested him. Though acquitted of any complicity in the plot itself, Roberts was imprisoned in the Gatehouse Prison at Westminster for seven months and then exiled again in July, 1606.

Foundation of St. Gregory's monastery, Douai
This time he was absent for some fourteen months, nearly all of which he spent at Douai (now in northern France) where he founded and became the first prior of a house for the English Benedictine monks who had entered various Spanish monasteries. This was the beginning of the monastery of St. Gregory's at Douai. This community of monks was banished from France in 1795 at the French Revolution and travelled to England where they settled at Downside Abbey, Somerset in 1814.

Return to England and martyrdom
Roberts returned to England in October 1607 and in December he was again arrested and placed in the Gatehouse at Westminster, from which he escaped after some months. After his escape, he lived for about a year in London, but in May 1609 was taken to Newgate Prison. He might have been executed, but Antonie de la Broderie, the French ambassador, interceded on his behalf, and his sentence was reduced to banishment.

Roberts again visited Spain and Douai, but returned to England, for a fifth time, within a year. He was captured again on 2 December 1610; the arresting men arrived just as he was finishing saying Mass in a house, having been followed by former priest turned spy John Cecil, who had compiled a dossier on Roberts for James I. He was taken to Newgate in his vestments. On 5 December he was tried and found guilty under the Act forbidding priests to minister in England, and on 10 December was hanged, drawn, and quartered, at the age of thirty-three, along with Thomas Somers, at Tyburn, London. 

It was usual for the prisoner to be disembowelled while still alive, but he was very popular among the poor of London because of the kindness he had shown them during the plague and the large crowd which gathered at his execution would not allow this. They insisted he be hanged to the death so as not to feel the pain. His heart was then held aloft by the executioner who proclaimed: "Behold the heart of the traitor!" But the angry crowd did not provide the standard response of "Long live the King!"; there was deathly silence.

Veneration

The introduction of the cause of beatification was approved by Pope Leo XIII in his Decree of 4 December 1886. On 25 October 1970, Roberts was canonised by Pope Paul VI as one of the representative Forty Martyrs of England and Wales.

Roman Catholic Bishop Edwin Regan said: "Although the name St John Roberts isn't as well known today, he is a major figure in our religious history." He was the first monk to return to Britain following the Protestant Reformation; the hostility between the Catholics and Protestants was at its height at this stage, when a Catholic priest could only expect to live for approximately two years in Britain during that period.

On 17 July 2010, Metropolitan Seraphim of Glastonbury of the British Orthodox Church, accompanied by Deacon Theodore de Quincey, attended an Ecumenical Service at Westminster Cathedral in celebration of the 400th anniversary of the Martyrdom of John Roberts. Abba Seraphim noted that as a Londoner he wanted to honour the humanitarian and pastoral ministry of Roberts to Londoners; and that all those who are conscious of the problems of exercising Christian ministry in times of persecution would immediately value Roberts's determination as well as realising the extraordinary sacrifice he made to fulfil his priestly vocation. Large contingents from Wales were in attendance and the service was bi-lingual. Archbishop of Canterbury Rowan Williams addressed the congregation in both English and Welsh. It was the first time Welsh had been spoken in a ceremony at Westminster Cathedral.

The choral piece, "Beatus Juan de Mervinia" in both Latin and Welsh, was specially commissioned for the service from the Welsh composer Brian Hughes.

Roberts is commemorated by a tourist trail from St Madryn's church Trawsfynydd to Cymer Abbey near Dolgellau, and by an exhibition in the Llys Ednowain Heritage Centre in Trawsfynydd.

Relics
The body of Roberts was recovered by a group that included Maurus Scott and taken to St. Gregory's, Douai, but disappeared during the French Revolution. An arm was found in the possession of the Spanish royal family before being returned to the Cathedral of Santiago de Compostela, where he had served as a novice. Fingers preserved as relics went to Downside Abbey, to Erdington Abbey, to the Sacred Cross Church in Gellilydan near Robert's birthplace, to Tyburn convent and to St Joseph's Convent, Taunton.

References

External links
Saint John Roberts at Catholic.org

1570s births
1610 deaths
Welsh Benedictines
Forty Martyrs of England and Wales
Martyred Roman Catholic priests
People executed by Stuart England by hanging, drawing and quartering
17th-century Welsh Roman Catholic priests
Converts to Roman Catholicism
Executed Welsh people
Welsh Roman Catholic martyrs
Welsh Roman Catholic saints
16th-century Welsh Roman Catholic priests
17th-century Roman Catholic martyrs
17th-century Christian saints
Alumni of St John's College, Oxford
Benedictine priors
People from Trawsfynydd